Pirates of the Caribbean: Dead Man's Chest is a 2006 action-adventure game based on the film of the same name developed by Griptonite Games and Amaze Entertainment for the Game Boy Advance, Nintendo DS, PlayStation Portable, and mobile phones.

Gameplay
The game incorporates role playing elements where Jack Sparrow and the Black Pearl can be customized. Dead Man's Chest is played on land and sea, on land the player must defeat enemies, search for treasure or for comrades, items, rumors and boat enhancements can be bought from towns. When on sea the player must travel from one island to another to play through the story or to explore the world. Sea battles can take place when the Black Pearl is steered towards other boats, during these battles the cannons are fired to damage the opposing ship and once when it has been sufficiently damaged, it's possible to board the burning ship and plunder it for food, grog and even treasures. The GBA version's gameplay is similar to the Castlevania game engine.

Reception

The game was met with mixed reception upon release.  GameRankings and Metacritic gave it a score of 74.30% and 70 out of 100 for the Game Boy Advance version; 63.54% and 63 out of 100 for the DS version; and 52.71% and 52 out of 100 for the PSP version.

See also
Pirates of the Caribbean: The Legend of Jack Sparrow
Pirates of the Caribbean video games

References

External links

Official website (Japanese)

2006 video games
Game Boy Advance games
Nintendo DS games
Dead Man's Chest
PlayStation Portable games
Griptonite Games
Video games developed in the United States
Video games set in the Caribbean
Video games set in Cuba
Video games set in Haiti
Video games set in Turkey
Amaze Entertainment games
Multiplayer and single-player video games
D3 Publisher games